Download: The True Story of the Internet is a documentary television series about Internet history. It is aired on Science Channel in the US and Discovery Channel for other countries. It originally aired on March 3, 2008. The show was hosted by John Heilemann.

More than a decade ago, a "browser war was fought between Netscape and Microsoft, between Navigator and Internet Explorer"

Parts 
There are four parts to the documentary:
 Part 1: Browser Wars – The rise and fall of Netscape and its battle against Microsoft
 Part 2: Search – The rise of Google and Yahoo
 Part 3: Bubble – The dot.com crash of 2000 and the mainstays of the Internet: Amazon.com and eBay
 Part 4: People Power – Peer to peer technology, web 2.0, and social networking

Interviews 
The documentary features interviews with:
 Marc Andreessen
 James H. Clark
 Shawn Fanning
 Justin Frankel
 Chad Hurley
 Rob McCool
 Lou Montulli
 Thomas Reardon
 Gary Reback
 Hillary Rosen
 Aleks Totic
Kevin Rose

References

External links 
 https://web.archive.org/web/20090823053456/http://science.discovery.com/tv/download/download.html
 Download The True Story of the Internet at IMDb

Documentary television series about computing
Science Channel original programming
2000s American documentary television series
2008 American television series debuts
2008 American television series endings
Discovery Channel original programming